(in English: In All Freedom) is the thirteenth album released by the Mexican rock band Maná. It is a remix/tribute album, fanatically constructed, and includes songs from Falta Amor to Exiliados En La Bahia. Being very similar to The Beatles’ Love, the intent of the mashup album was to bring to the fans and audience a remix like no other, for the real fans to listen to Maná like they never have.

Track listing

Elementos de Canciones

Oye Mi Amor 

-Me Vale
-Selva Negra
-Sor María
-Hechicera
-El Espejo
-En El Muelle de San Blás

Manda Una Señal 

-Como Te Deseo
-El Espejo
-Rayando El Sol
-En El Muelle de San Blás

Déjame Entrar 

-Un Nuevo Amanecer
-Combatiente
-Relax
-No Te Rindas
-Ana
-Sor María

Vivir Sin Aire/La Puerta Azul 

-Vivir Sin Aire (MTV Unplugged)
-No Te Rindas
-Tú Me Salvaste

El Dragón 

-Demos
-Rayando el Sol (Vivo)
-Déjame Entrar (Vivo)
-El Espejo

Dónde Jugarán Los Niños 

-Version 1994
-Version 2008
-Rayando el Sol (Vivo)

Arde El Cielo/Latinoamérica/El Viaje 

-Angel de Amor
-El Dragón
-Tú Me Salvaste
-Mi Corazón No Sabe Olvidar

Mr. Gruf 

-Me Voy a Convertir en Un Ave
-Sin Tu Cariño

Vuela Libre Paloma/Sor María 

-No Ha Parado de Llover

Hasta Que Te Conocí/Corazón Espinado/Tonto en La Lluvia 

-No Te Rindas
-Me Vale

El Espejo 

-Porque Te Vas
-Somos Mar & Arena
-No Ha Parado de Llover
-Demo

Hechicera 

-El Borracho
-Cuando Los Angeles Lloran
-El Viaje (Dub)

Lluvia al Corazón 

-Mi Reina del Dolor
-Ay Doctor
-Vivir Sin Aire (1994)
-El Viaje

Arráncame El Corazón 

-Como Un Perro Enloquecido

Labios Compartidos 

-Un Lobo Por Tu Amor
-Combatiente
-Clavado en Un Bar

El Rey Tiburón 

-Bendita Tu Luz

Personnel (band) 

 Fher Olvera – main vocals, acoustic guitar, coros, programming,
 Alex González – drums, vocals, coros, programming, keyboards
 Sergio Vallín – acoustic & electric guitars, coros, orchestral arrangements, string arrangements, keyboards, programming
 Juan Diego Calleros – bass

Additional personnel 

 GusOrozco – guitar & bass arrangements, programming, keyboards
 Fernando "Psycho" Vallín – low arrangements, electric bass
 Fernando "El Bueno" Quintana – guitar & bass arrangements, string arrangements, coros, keyboards

 Héctor Quintana – coros
 Carlos Munguía – coros
 Luis Conte – percussions
 Jeff Babko – keyboards
 Benjamin "Jamie" Muhoberac – keyboards
 Tommy Morgan – harmonica
 Suzie Katayama – orchestra director
 Charlie Bisharat – master concert violinist
 Jackie Brand – violin
 Mario de León – violin
 Tammy Hatwan – violin
 Gerry Hilera – violin
 Tereza Stanislav – violin
 Josefina Vergara – violin

 Ken Yerke – violin
 Matt Funes – viola
 Jorge Moraga – viola
 Steve Richards – cello
 Rudy Stein – cello
 Nico Abondolo – contrabass
 David Parmeter – contrabass
 Chris Bleth – oboe
 Joe Meyer – French horn
 Steve Becknell – French horn
 Alan Kaplan – trombone
 Toño Márquez – lyrical advisor
 Augusto Chacón – copy editor
 José Quintana – vocal direction

External links 

  

Maná albums
2013 remix albums